Glenn Holgersson (born 5 November 1979) is a former Swedish footballer, last playing for FC Rosengård.

Career
He has primarily played left back or centre back. He played for Kirseberg IF, Malmö FF, Höllvikens GIF and IFK Malmö, before joining Malmö FF for a second time. From 2006 to 2009 he played for Örebro SK; he then joined FC Rosengård.

References

External links 
 

1979 births
Living people
Swedish footballers
Allsvenskan players
IFK Malmö Fotboll players
Malmö FF players
Örebro SK players
Association football defenders
FC Rosengård 1917 players